All City High is located at 1305 Lyell Avenue in Rochester, New York.

It is a program for students in the Rochester City School District who are ages 17-21 and want a smaller, semester-based school.

Demographics
Hispanic 31%
White 5.6%
African American 61.6%
Asian 0.9%
Native American 0% 

All City High's free/reduced lunch rate is 91% of the students.

Facilities
The school a small one gym and a field that is used by PE and classroom teachers.

Extra-curricular
Students at All City High are still enrolled at their home school and are eligible to participate in extra-curricular activities including sports at their home school.

Notable alumni
None

See also
Rochester City School District

External links
All City High website

References

Public high schools in New York (state)
High schools in Monroe County, New York